Ryukyu Islands legislative Islands legislative election, 1968. It was held in November that year.

Results

See also
Government of the Ryukyu Islands
1962 Ryukyu Islands legislative election

Sources
The Europa World Year Book 1970, Volume II, p. 1252

1960s in Okinawa
Elections in Okinawa Prefecture
1968 in Japan
November 1968 events in Asia
Ryukyu Islands